Robert Long (13 April 1932 – 11 February 2010) was a New Zealand cricketer. He played fifteen first-class matches for Otago between 1953 and 1964.

See also
 List of Otago representative cricketers

References

External links
 

1932 births
2010 deaths
New Zealand cricketers
Otago cricketers
People from Ranfurly, New Zealand